The 2017 European Senior Tour was the 26th season of the European Senior Tour, the professional golf tour for men aged 50 and above operated by the PGA European Tour.

Tournament results
The numbers in brackets after the winners' names show the number of career wins they had on the European Senior Tour up to and including that event. This is only shown for players who are members of the tour.

  

For the tour schedule on the European Senior Tour's website, including links to full results, click here.

Qualifying school
The qualifying school was played in Portugal in late January and early February 2017. There were two 36-hole "stage 1" events with the leading players in these events joining a number of exempt players in the 72-hole final stage. As in 2016 there were just five qualifying places available for the 2017 season. With 18 exempt players and a minimum field of 72 for the final stage, the leading 27 players and ties from the two "stage 1" event qualified for the final stage. There was a cut after 54 holes with players more than eight shots away from the fifth qualifying place not playing the final round.

The following five players gained their places on the 2017 European Senior Tour:

Sallat beat Jeff Hall and David Shacklady with a birdie on the first playoff hole.

Leading money winners

There is a complete list on the official site here.

References

External links

European Senior Tour
European Senior Tour